William Yngve Anderson (June 28, 1921 – May 9, 2011) was a Swedish-born American fighter ace of World War II, credited with seven official victories in Europe while flying P-51 Mustang fighters with the United States Army Air Forces.

Anderson was born in Kramfors, Sweden, on June 28, 1921. In 1922, Anderson's family emigrated from Sweden to Chicago. Anderson joined the United States Army Air Forces in September 1941. After completion of training in 1943, he was stationed at RAF Boxted, near London, on "Diver" patrols, defending London from V-1 flying bombs.

Anderson shot down a V-1 on June 17, 1944, and it is possible but not confirmed that he shot down more V-1s. His official tally of 7, however, does not include V-1s, as shooting down pilotless aircraft did not officially count towards his victory tally.

Official victories:
13 April 1944 one Focke-Wulf Fw 190
28 May 1944 one Messerschmitt Bf 109
21 June 1944 two Messerschmitt Me 410s
1 August 1944 one Bf 109
7 August 1944 two Bf 109s

References

External links
William Y. Anderson's obituary

1921 births
2011 deaths
American World War II flying aces
United States Army Air Forces personnel of World War II
Recipients of the Air Medal
Recipients of the Croix de Guerre 1939–1945 (France)
Recipients of the Distinguished Flying Cross (United States)
Recipients of the Silver Star
Swedish emigrants to the United States